Electracy is a theory by Gregory Ulmer that describes the skills necessary to exploit the full communicative potential of a new electronic media such as multimedia, hypermedia, social software, and virtual worlds.  According to Ulmer, electracy "is to digital media what literacy is to print." It encompasses the broader cultural, institutional, pedagogical, and ideological implications inherent in the major societal transition from print to electronic media. Electracy is a portmanteau of "electricity" and Jacques Derrida's term "trace".

Concept 

Electracy denotes a broad spectrum of research possibilities including the history and invention of writing and mnemonic practices, the epistemological and ontological changes resulting from such practices, the sociological and psychological implications of a networked culture, and the pedagogical implementation of practices derived from such explorations.

Ulmer writes of electracy:

What literacy is to the analytical mind, electracy is to the affective body: 

A prosthesis that enhances and augments a natural or organic human potential. 

Alphabetic writing is an artificial memory that supports long complex chains of reasoning impossible to sustain within the organic mind.

Digital imaging similarly supports extensive complexes of mood atmospheres beyond organic capacity.

Electrate logic proposes to design these atmospheres into affective group intelligence.

Literacy and electracy in collaboration produce a civilizational left-brain right-brain integration. 

If literacy focused on universally valid methodologies of knowledge (sciences), electracy focuses on the individual state of mind within which knowing takes place (arts).

Ulmer's work considers other historical moments of radical technological change such as the inventions of the alphabet, writing, and the printing press. Also, electracy is grammatological in deriving a methodology from the history of writing and mnemonic practices. 

Ulmer introduced electracy in Teletheory (1989), and it began to be noted in scholarship in 1997. James Inman regarded electracy as one of the "most prominent" contemporary designations for what Walter J. Ong once described as a "secondary orality" that will eventually supplant print literacy. Inman distinguishes electracy from other literacies (such as metamedia), stating that it is a broader concept unique for being ontologically dependent exclusively on electronic media. Some scholars have viewed the electracy paradigm, along with other "apparatus theories" such as Ong's, with skepticism, arguing that they are "essentialist" or "determinist".

Pedagogy 

Lisa Gye states that the transition from literacy to electracy has changed "the ways in which we think, write and exchange ideas," and that Ulmer's primary concern is to understand how that has transformed learning. 

Electracy as an educational aim has been recognized by scholars in several fields including English composition and rhetoric, literary and media criticism, digital media and art, and architecture. Mikesch Muecke explains that "Gregory Ulmer's ideas on electracy provide ... a model for a new pedagogy where learning is closer to invention than verification." Alan Clinton, in a review of Internet Invention, writes that "Ulmer's pedagogy ultimately levels the playing field between student and teacher."  

Ulmer himself writes:

Electrate pedagogy is based in art/aesthetics as relays for operating new media organized as a prosthesis for learning any subject whatsoever. The near absence of art in contemporary schools is the electrate equivalent of the near absence of science in medieval schools for literacy. The suppression of empirical inquiry by religious dogmatism during the era sometimes called the "dark ages" (reflecting the hostility of the oral apparatus to literacy), is paralleled today by the suppression of aesthetic play by empirical utilitarianism (reflecting the hostility of the literate apparatus to electracy). The ambivalent relation of the institutions of school and entertainment today echoes the ambivalence informing church–science relations throughout the era of literacy.

Ulmer's educational methods fit into a constructivist pedagogical theory and practice. He discusses the relationship between pedagogy and electracy at length in an interview with Sung-Do Kim published in 2005.

See also 
Computer literacy
Information literacy
Transliteracy

References 

Mnemonics
Information society
Philosophy of education
Literacy